John Arthur Eyton-Jones  (25 September 1862 – 3 March 1940) was a Welsh footballer who played as a forward. He was part of the Wales national team between 1883 and 1884, playing four matches and scoring one goal. He played his first match on 17 March 1883 against Ireland and his last match on 29 March 1884 against Scotland.

Early life

Eyton-Jones was born in Wrexham, Denbighshire, Wales, is a member of the Eyton-Jones family, and was an uncle of William Eyton-Jones. He was educated at the Grove Park School in Wrexham where he was a younger contemporary of Robert Armstrong-Jones.

Sporting and Football Career

Eyton-Jones played football with the Wrexham Hare and Hounds Club.

He was part of the Wales national football team between 1883 and 1884, playing four matches and scoring one goal. He played his first match on 17 March 1883 against Ireland and his last match on 29 March 1884 against Scotland.

He also played for Everton in 1888.

Military service

Eyton-Jones served as a medical officer in the 1st Volunteer Battalion of the Royal Welsh Fusiliers, and saw action in World War I as a Captain with the Royal Army Medical Corps.

Personal life

Eyton-Jones worked as a local doctor and surgeon in the Wrexham area and lived at Abbotsfield on Grosvenor Road. This elegant neo-gothic Grade II Listed house was designed by architect James Reynolds Gummow of the Wrexham architect family in the 1860s as a private residence, and was purchased by Eyton-Jones in 1895.

He married twice, firstly in 1890 to Annie  Isabella Shand Stodart-Milne. They had a daughter Margaret Susannah Maurice Eyton-Jones. Annie died in 1908 aged 38. Eyton-Jones married again in 1909 to Marie Anne Jones, a State Registered Nurse. Their son Arthur Paget Eyton-Jones was born in 1920.

See also
 List of Wales international footballers (alphabetical)

References

1860 births
1940 deaths
Welsh footballers
Footballers from Wrexham
Wales international footballers
Association football forwards
Wrexham A.F.C. players
British Army personnel of World War I
Royal Welch Fusiliers officers
Royal Army Medical Corps officers